Edward George Freeman (May 1, 1900 – October 9, 1986) was a politician in Ontario, Canada. He was a New Democratic member of the Legislative Assembly of Ontario from 1963 to 1967 who represented the northern Ontario riding of Fort William as an NDP member.

Background
Freeman had lied about his age in order to enlist in the Canadian army and serve during World War I. He was decorated several times during the war. He was a salesman and moved to Fort William in 1935. Freeman was a long-serving member of the Loyal Order of Elk Lodge #82, in Fort William. He joined the Lodge in 1940 and held a variety of positions, culminating in his election, in 1959-1960, as the Grand Exalted Ruler of the Lodge.

Politics
In the 1963 provincial election, Freeman ran as the New Democratic candidate in the riding of Fort William. He defeated Tory candidate Chris Asseff by 1,124 votes. Liberal incumbent John Chapple came in third. He served as an opposition member under the leadership of Donald MacDonald. In the 1967 election he was defeated by Tory candidate Jim Jessiman.

References

External links 
 

1900 births
1986 deaths
Ontario New Democratic Party MPPs
People from Hastings County